322 is a year on the Julian Calendar.

322 may also refer to:
 322 (film), Slovak film by director Dušan Hanák
 322 (number)
 Plimpton 322, a Babylonian tablet
 U.S. Route 322, an east–west highway traversing Ohio, Pennsylvania, and New Jersey
 Skull and Bones or Order 322, a secret student society at Yale University in New Haven, Connecticut